Florent Laville (born 7 August 1973) is a French former professional footballer who played as a defender.

Club career
Born in Valence, Drôme, Laville spent the first ten years of his career with Olympique Lyonnais, and helped them win the Ligue 1 title in 2002 and 2003 as well as the Trophée des Champions in 2002. Laville signed with Premier League club Bolton Wanderers in 2003 and instantly slotted into the first team, forming a successful defensive partnership with Guðni Bergsson, despite a sending off in a memorable game against Arsenal. He later signed permanently for Bolton, but a serious leg injury suffered several games into the 2003–04 season, against Middlesbrough, put him out of action for over a year and effectively ended his top-level playing career as he struggled to regain fitness.

After leaving Bolton at the end of the 2004–05 season, Laville eventually returned to fitness and briefly played for Coventry City before returning to France, reuniting with former Bolton teammate, Pierre-Yves André at SC Bastia. His contract expired at the end of the 2006–07 season and he subsequently retired.

International career
Laville represented France at the 1996 Summer Olympics.

Honours
Lyon
 Ligue 1: 2001–02, 2002–03
 UEFA Intertoto Cup: 1997
 Trophée des Champions: 2002

References

External links

1973 births
Living people
Sportspeople from Valence, Drôme
French footballers
Footballers from Auvergne-Rhône-Alpes
Association football defenders
France under-21 international footballers
Footballers at the 1996 Summer Olympics
Olympic footballers of France
Ligue 1 players
Premier League players
Olympique Lyonnais players
Bolton Wanderers F.C. players
Coventry City F.C. players
SC Bastia players
French expatriate footballers
French expatriate sportspeople in England
Expatriate footballers in England